Maryland Route 710 (MD 710) is a state highway in the U.S. state of Maryland. Known as Ordnance Road, the state highway runs  from MD 2 in Glen Burnie east to MD 173 in Brooklyn Park at the city limits of Baltimore. MD 710 provides access to the Defense Logistics Agency Curtis Bay Depot, a unit of the General Services Administration. The state highway is named for the federal site's prior use as a U.S. Army Depot. MD 710 was constructed in the early 1940s and relocated for most of its length concurrent with the construction of MD 10 in the early 1970s.

Route description

MD 710 begins at an intersection with MD 2 (Governor Ritchie Highway) surrounded by four shopping centers in Glen Burnie. The roadway continues west as county-maintained West Ordnance Road. MD 710 heads east as a four-lane divided highway and meets MD 10 (Arundel Expressway) at a partial cloverleaf interchange. Beyond MD 10, the state highway curves to the northeast, crosses a branch of Furnace Creek, and reduces to a two-lane undivided road. MD 710 passes the Anne Arundel County Correctional Center, a U.S. Army Reserve Center, and the Defense Logistics Agency Curtis Bay Depot. The state highway curves east and has a grade crossing of CSX's Curtis Bay Branch underneath Interstate 695 (I-695, Baltimore Beltway). MD 710's eastern terminus is at an intersection with MD 173 (Pennington Avenue/Hawkins Point Road) in Brooklyn Park at the city limits of Baltimore.

History
MD 710 was constructed as a  concrete road in 1942 to connect the Curtis Bay Ordnance Depot with MD 173 and MD 2. The highway originally followed what is now MD 711 east from MD 2. Beyond MD 711, the highway headed east through the site of MD 10's interchange with I-695 to what is now the U.S. Army Reserve Center, then followed its present alignment to MD 173. MD 710 was relocated to its present course, including the divided highway segment, in 1972 in conjunction with the construction of MD 10.

Junction list

See also

References

External links

MDRoads: MD 710
MD 710 at AARoads.com

710
Maryland Route 710